Roger Goodman "Thug" Murray (May 8, 1898 – August, 1979) was an American college football player and coach.

Naval Academy
Murray played on Navy teams which beat Army twice. The New York Times wrote of Murray's play in the 1920 game, praising Murray for opening holes through which "a wagon could be driven." He was a member of Sigma Alpha Epsilon.

Sewanee
After a short stint with the Merchant Marines, Murray played for the Sewanee Tigers in 1921 and 1922. He wore number 10. Billy Evans selected him All-Southern in 1922, placing him on his "Southern Honor Roll." Walter Camp gave Murray honorable mention on his All-America team. Murray was placed on Sewanee's "All-Time" football team.

Cumberland
He then went on to Cumberland to finish his law degree, as well as perform the function of football player, head football coach, and athletics director. Murray was posthumously inducted into the Cumberland Sports Hall of Fame in 1981, and into the Tennessee Sports Hall of Fame in 1983. He was the first posthumous inductee of the latter.

References

1898 births
1979 deaths
American football tackles
Cumberland Phoenix football coaches
Cumberland Phoenix football players
Navy Midshipmen football players
Sewanee Tigers football players
All-Southern college football players
People from Jackson, Tennessee
Coaches of American football from Tennessee
Players of American football from Tennessee